Globivenus banaconensis  is a species of marine bivalve mollusc in the family Veneridae.

Original description
Poppe G.T., Tagaro S.P. & Goto Y. (2018). New marine species from the Central Philippines. Visaya. 5(1): 91-135. page(s): 116, pl. 16 figs 1-2.

References

External links
 Worms Link

Veneridae